Ken Beck (born 4 August 1940) is a retired Australian rules footballer who played with Hawthorn in the Victorian Football League (VFL).

Originally from Stawell, Beck was a tall ruckman and made his league debut in 1962. He was a regular member of the team during the 1960s and was a reserve in their 1971 premiership side.

1972 was Beck’s last season and he was elected captain of the Reserves. His last game was the VFL Reserves Grand Final in which his side won the Premiership.

After VFL

Beck accepted a two year contract to captain-coach Dandenong in the VFA for the 1973 and 1974 seasons. He later played for Prahran and Oakleigh.  In 1978 he was playing in the Mornington Peninsula League with Seaford. He won that league's Best & Fairest in 1978.

Honours and achievements 
Hawthorn
 VFL premiership player: 1971
 2× Minor premiership: 1963, 1971

Individual
 Victoria Australian rules football team: 1966
 Hawthorn life member

References
Holmesby, Russell and Main, Jim (2007). The Encyclopedia of AFL Footballers. 7th ed. Melbourne: Bas Publishing.

External links

1940 births
Australian rules footballers from Victoria (Australia)
Hawthorn Football Club players
Hawthorn Football Club Premiership players
Stawell Football Club players
Living people
One-time VFL/AFL Premiership players